The 2009 World Touring Car Championship season was the sixth FIA World Touring Car Championship season, the fifth since its 2005 return. It began on 8 March, and ended on 22 November, after twenty-four races. The championship, which was reserved for Super 2000 Cars and Diesel 2000 Cars, comprised two titles, the FIA World Touring Car Champion for Drivers and the FIA World Touring Car Champion for Manufacturers.

Italian Gabriele Tarquini won the Drivers' Championship by four points from SEAT Sport team-mate Yvan Muller, with BMW Team Germany's Augusto Farfus finishing third ten points behind Muller. The Manufacturers Championship was retained by SEAT beating BMW by just three points. Tom Coronel took the Independents' Trophy for SUNRED Engineering, which won the Teams' Trophy.

Teams and drivers
The following teams and drivers contested the 2009 FIA World Touring Car Championship:

Driver changes
Changed Teams
 Stefano D'Aste: Scuderia Proteam Motorsport → Wiechers-Sport
 Sergio Hernández: Scuderia Proteam Motorsport → BMW Team Italy-Spain
 Félix Porteiro: BMW Team Italy-Spain → Scuderia Proteam Motorsport
 Kristian Poulsen: Wiechers-Sport → Liqui Moly Team Engstler
 James Thompson: N-Technology → LADA Sport

Entering WTCC Including those who entered one-off rounds in 2008
 Mehdi Bennani: No full-time drive → Exagon Engineering
 Tom Boardman: SEAT León Eurocup → SUNRED Engineering
 Marin Čolak: SEAT León Eurocup → Čolak Racing Team Ingra
 Vito Postiglione: Italian GT Championship → Scuderia Proteam Motorsport

Leaving WTCC
 Pierre-Yves Corthals: Exagon Engineering → Belgian Touring Car Series
 Ibrahim Okyay: Borusan Otomotiv Motorsport → Unknown
 Andrey Romanov: Liqui Moly Team Engstler → ADAC Procar Series

Calendar
The first provisional calendar was released in October 2008.

Marrakech hosted a round on a new temporary street circuit in the heart of the city on 3 May. and Porto returned to the championship.

On 5 November 2008, FIA released a new provisional calendar, and announced the date of the Race of Germany in Oschersleben moved from 30 August to 6 September (due to clash with the date of the Belgian Formula One Grand Prix), and the date of the Race of Japan in Okayama moved from 25 October to 1 November. The Race of Italy was originally scheduled to be run in Monza but it was changed to Imola, and the date of the event in Italy was also changed (from 4 October to 20 September).

Results and standings

Races

Standings

Drivers' Championship

† — Drivers did not finish the race, but were classified as they completed over 90% of the race distance.

Drivers' Championship points were awarded on a 10-8-6-5-4-3-2-1 basis to the first eight finishers in each of the twenty four races. All results obtained were taken into account.

Manufacturers' Championship

Manufacturers' Championship points were awarded on a 10-8-6-5-4-3-2-1 basis to the first eight finishers in each of the twenty four races. All results obtained by the best two classified cars per manufacturer were taken into account. All other cars from the same manufacturer were considered to be invisible in terms of points scoring.

Yokohama Independents' Trophy

 The Yokohama Independents' Trophy used a similar points system to that used for the Drivers’ Championship, however bonus points were also awarded at each event for race one pole position and for the fastest race lap, unlike the Drivers' championship. Three bonus points per position were awarded if an independent driver finished in the overall top eight, e.g. if a driver finished sixth overall, he or she received nine bonus points. Double points were awarded at the final event at Macau.

Yokohama Teams' Trophy

All the teams taking part in any of the rounds of the 2009 FIA World Touring Car Championship were eligible to
score points for the Yokohama Teams' Trophy. Points were awarded to the two best classified cars of each team, providing they were driven by Independent drivers. All other cars of that same team were considered invisible as far as scoring points was concerned.

Notes

References

External links

 FIA World Touring Car Championship official website: Archives
 2009 Season archives
 2009 Championship point standings
 2009 Independents' Trophies point standings
 2009 FIA World Touring Car Championship – Sporting Regulations 
 2009 FIA World Touring Car Championship – Yokohama Independents’ Trophies Regulations
 Regulations for Super 2000 Cars
 Regulations for Diesel 2000 Cars
 2009 FIA World Touring Car Championship – Points Tables
 2009 FIA World Touring Car Championship – Yokohama Independents’ Trophies Points Tables
 2009 FIA World Touring Car Championship – images